The Flight are an English musical duo consisting of Joe Henson and Alexis Smith. The duo has written songs and composed for film, TV shows and video games. Joe Henson started his professional music career as a touring bass player, most notably in the band The Freestylers.

Discography

Video games

Television

References

External links
 Official website

Musical groups established in 2005